Bit City is an incremental game and city-builder game developed by NimbleBit, released on March 13, 2017 for iOS and Android. The game tasks players with building a city one plot of land at a time, with zoning and pixelated buildings that vaguely resemble previous games from the developer, such as Tiny Tower or Disco Zoo. Bit City also includes some features similar to Egg, Inc such as an upgrade shop and the ability to prestige.

The game's initial reception has been overwhelmingly positive, with the game reaching the #1 spot for free games on App Store. , the ratings for Bit City are 4.5 stars on the App Store and 4.3 on the Google Play Store.

Gameplay 

The player is tasked with building a city with the goal of having the city reach a certain population. The city has a predetermined number of plots which can be small or large plots. When a player decides to buy a plot they are prompted to pick one of the three "zones", Residential, Business, or Service. Once a plot is built on, it will add 1000 residents per 1x1 square to the city and will provide a certain number of coins to the player per second. Cars can also be bought and will sometimes have a coin bonus on them which, when clicked, gives the player coins or will have bux bonus (which when tapped gives the player bux). Later in the game, boats and planes can be bought and will also sometimes give a coin bonus.

Each city also has a government building which allows the player to upgrade certain aspects of their city. Upgrades can apply only to the player's current city or can be permanent (applies even when the player prestiges or moves on to the next city).

The player can also prestige which sends them back to the first city with a certain number of Keys (each gives a 1% permanent earnings boost). However, the player keeps all of their bux and all of the game (permanent) upgrades the player has made.

Reception 

GameZebo gave Bit City a 4.5/5 star rating, noting the "upbeat, jazzy soundtrack", the "huge selection of building types", calling it a "solid, highly addictive game that is as close to as perfect a blend of clicker and city builder as you’re likely to find anywhere". 148Apps gave an overall rating of 3/5 stars, praising the user interface and sound track, but stating "in 2017, it feels really uninspired", and "it doesn't really offer anything new to the genre". Pocket Gamer gave 6 out of 10 saying the game was "an empty clicker disguised as SimCity".

References 

2017 video games
Android (operating system) games
City-building games
Incremental games
IOS games
NimbleBit games
Single-player video games
Video games developed in the United States